Rhododendron stenopetalum is a rhododendron species native to southern Honshu and Shikoku, Japan. It is a low shrub, with leaves that are 3–5 mm wide by 5 cm long. Its flowers are pink or lavender-pink.

References

Sources 
 D.J. Mabberley, 1990 In: Feddes Repert., 101(5-6): 270
 GBIF
 US Plant National Germplasm System
 Oregon State University
 American Rhododendron Society

stenopetalum